Winthrop Astor Chanler (October 14, 1863 – August 24, 1926) was an American sportsman and soldier who fought in the Spanish–American War and World War I.

Chanler, a descendant of many prominent American families including the Dudley–Winthrop, Livingston, and Stuyvesant families, and his wife were also prominent in New York society during the Gilded Age.

Early life

Chanler, who was known as "Wintie" was born on October 14, 1863 in New York City.  He was the second son of eleven children born to Margaret Astor (née Ward) Chanler (1838–1875) and John Winthrop Chanler (1826–1877), a U.S. Representative from New York.

He and his siblings became orphans after the death of their mother in December 1875 and their father in October 1877, both to pneumonia.  The children, known as the "Astor Orphans", were raised at their parents' estate in Rokeby, New York, built by John Armstrong Jr., his mother's great-grandfather.  His father's estate was valued between $1,500,000 (equivalent to $) and $2,000,000 (equivalent to $ in  dollars). John Winthrop Chanler's will provided $20,000 a year for each child for life (equivalent to $470,563 in 2018 dollars), enough to live comfortably by the standards of the time. Winthrop himself inherited all of his father's personal property in his New York City home, located at 192 Madison Avenue, all of his real estate in Delaware County, and a house on Cliff Lawn in Newport.

Chanler prepared for University at Eton College and at St. John's Military Academy in Sing Sing, New York. In 1885 Winthrop graduated from Harvard College, which his brother William also attended from 1886 to 1888. While at Harvard, Winthrop was part of a prank played on Oscar Wilde when he appeared before the College to give a speech at the Boston Music Hall in 1882. Chanler, along with 60 other Harvard students, "marched down the center aisle in pairs, all carrying sunflowers and wearing Wildean costumes of knee breeches, black stockings, wide-spreading cravats, and shoulder length wigs." His great-aunt Julia Ward Howe, who considered Winthrop her favorite, was in the audience and was apparently aghast at the prank.

Family
Through his mother, he was related to the Ward and Astor families, and through his father, he was related to the Dudley–Winthrop, Livingston, and Stuyvesant families.  Of his ten brothers and sisters, many were prominent including John Armstrong Chaloner, a writer; Robert Winthrop Chanler, an artist; and William Astor Chanler, a noted soldier and explorer who served in the U.S. House of Representatives like their father, Lewis Stuyvesant Chanler, the Lt. Gov. of New York.  His sister Margaret Livingston Chanler was married to critic Richard Aldrich and served as a nurse with the American Red Cross during the Spanish–American War, and sister Elizabeth Astor Winthrop Chanler was married to author John Jay Chapman.

Career
After his marriage, the Chanlers moved to Washington, D.C. where the surrounded themselves with a group of friends including Theodore Roosevelt, who was then the Civil Service Commissioner, and later President of the United States.

Military service
 
 
DDuring the Spanish–American War, Chanler did not enlist in the regular U.S. Army but instead joined the 1st United States Volunteer Cavalry, better known as the "Rough Riders", including his younger brother William, to join the Cuban volunteers under General Emilio Núñez.  His brother received a Captain's commission from President William McKinley to serve under U.S. General Joseph Wheeler and Winthrop received a conditional commission as Lieutenant colonel under the Cuban government. On June 30, 1898 in the Battle of Tayacoba, Chanler led twenty-five Rough Riders.  Chanler, Captain Jose Manuel Núñez (brother of General Núñez), and William Louis Abbott and about 30 men went ashore near Trinidad, Cuba to ensure the safety of the landing site. They were discovered by Spanish scouts and came under heavy fire.  During the battle, Captain Núñez was killed and Chanler was shot through the right elbow. They had to take cover in a mangrove swamp until they could be rescued by the American steamship Florida.  Chanler returned to his home in Barrytown to recover from his injuries.  By the time his arm healed, the war was over, so Chanler sailed to Europe where he stayed for several years in Sorrento, Italy taking a "life of hunting." uring World War I, he served as an aide to General John J. Pershing, who served as the commander of the American Expeditionary Force on the Western Front from 1917 to 1918.

Society life
 Due to his elder brother's mental issues, Winthrop became the de facto head of the Chanler family.  The Chanler's spent the winter of 1891 to 1892 in New York where three of his sisters were introduced to society. Thereafter, they moved to Tuxedo Park, New York which according to his wife, "seemed dull in its exclusiveness; the tendency of Anglo-Saxons to separate into 'social sets and hierarchies' was in striking contrast to the hospitality and cosmopolitanism of Roman society" where she had grown up.  In the late 1890s, they lived in Newport, Rhode Island where Chanler paid taxes on an estate valued at $96,300 in 1895.

In 1892, both Chanler and his wife Margaret were included in Ward McAllister's "Four Hundred", purported to be an index of New York's best families, published in The New York Times. Conveniently, 400 was the number of people that could fit into Mrs. Astor's ballroom. His wife described the list of New York's elite as "not unlike Dante's description of Paradise." 
Chanler, a member of the Society of Patriarchs, attended the Patriarch's Ball organized by McAllister for his fellow "American aristocrats" at Delmonico's in December 1892.

In 1903, Chanler moved from Newport to Geneseo, New York in Livingston County.  While in Genseo, he served as master of the hounds of the Genesee Valley Hunt Club.  He reportedly spent most of his time fox hunting and horse breeding at his estate, Sweet Briar Farms, which was once owned by the Wadsworth family.  In 1913, his wife, who was Catholic, built the Chapel of St. Felicity at the Farm.

Personal life
On December 16, 1886, Chanler was married to Margaret Louisa Terry (1862–1952), a first cousin, once removed, in Rome, Italy.  Margaret's grandparents (Julia Rush Cutler and Samuel Ward Jr) were also Chanler's maternal great grandparents. Margaret, who grew up in the Palazzo Odescalchi in Rome, was the daughter of Louisa (née Ward) Crawford Terry and artist Luther Terry (d. 1900), a half-sister of F. Marion Crawford and a niece of Julia Ward Howe.  Together, they were the parents of:
 
 Laura Astor Chanler (1887–1984), who married Lawrence Grant White (1887–1956), an architect with McKim, Mead & White and the son of Stanford White, in 1916.
 John Winthrop Chanler II (1889–1894), who died young.
 Beatrice Margaret Chanler (1891–1974), who married Pierre Francis Allegaert (1896–1961).
 Hester Marion Chanler (1893–1990), who married Edward Motley Pickman, a descendant of Dudley Leavitt Pickman, in 1915.  Hester was a bridesmaid at the wedding of Ethel Roosevelt Derby in 1913.
 Marion Winthrop Chanler (1895–1931), who drowned.
 Margaret Gabrielle "May" Chanler (1897–1958), who married Porter Ralph Chandler (1899–1979).
 Hubert Winthrop Chanler (1900–1974), who married Gertrude Laughlin (1914–1999), daughter of Ambassador Irwin B. Laughlin.
 Theodore Ward Chanler (1902-1961), who married Maria De Acosta Sargent (1880–1970).  Theodore's godfather was President Theodore Roosevelt, who attended his christening in Newport in 1902.

On August 5, 1926, Chanler suffered a stroke following a fall from his horse.  He died at Brigham Hall in Canandaigua, New York on August 24, 1926. He was buried at St. Mary's Catholic Cemetery in Geneseo, New York.  After his death, his widow wrote several novels and a memoir entitled Roman Spring, published in 1934. A second memoir, entitled  Autumn in the Valley was published by Little, Brown and Company, 1936.

Descendants
Through his son Hubert, he was the grandfather of Susanne Felicity Chanler, who married Stephen Young; Gay Chanler, who married John Andrew Gunther; and Elizabeth Chanler, who married Bruce Chatwin (1940–1989), the English writer, novelist, and journalist.

References
Notes

Sources

External links
 

1863 births
1926 deaths
Astor family
Astor Orphans
People educated at Eton College
Harvard College alumni
People included in New York Society's Four Hundred
Chanler family
Winthrop family
Military personnel from New York City